Joseph Edward Rodwell-Grant (born 18 October 2002) is an English professional footballer who plays as a striker for the EFL Championship club Wigan Athletic.

Career
Rodwell-Grant was born in Haslingden, Lancashire and grew up in Rossendale with his mother. He joined the youth academy of Preston North End at the age of 11, after he was picked up playing junior football in East Lancashire. In 2020, he went on successive loans with non-league sides Chorley and Bamber Bridge. He signed his first professional contract with the club on 12 May 2021. He made his professional debut with Preston North End in a 3–0 EFL Cup win over Mansfield Town on 10 August 2021. He was released by the club at the end of the 2021–22 season.

On 29 July 2022, he signed a contract with Wigan Athletic after a successful trial period. In September 2022, he joined FC United of Manchester on loan before returning to the club in October.

Career statistics

References

External links
 
 PNE FC Profile

2002 births
Living people
People from Haslingden
English footballers
Preston North End F.C. players
Chorley F.C. players
Bamber Bridge F.C. players
Lancaster City F.C. players
Wigan Athletic F.C. players
F.C. United of Manchester players
English Football League players
National League (English football) players
Northern Premier League players
Association football forwards